was a Japanese duo consisting of NEWS members Yuya Tegoshi and Takahisa Masuda, formed to promote Johnny's Entertainment internationally. The group's name is a merging of Tegoshi's and Masuda's names.

History
Tegomass released their first single "Miso Soup" in Sweden in November 2006 and held several promotions there. A month later, the duo released the Japanese version of the single in Japan. The next single, "Kiss (Kaerimichi no Love Song)", was released on May 16, 2007. The songs on this second single were used as theme songs for the Lovely Complex anime, with the title track as the ending theme, and the second track, "Kimi + Boku = Love?", as the opening theme. On June 18, 2008, the duo released its third single, "Ai Ai Gasa", the ending theme for the anime Neo Angelique Abyss.

On July 8, 2009, the duo released a fourth single, "Tanabata Matsuri". It went to #1, selling 80,243 copies in the first week (total sales so far - 100,714). Tegomass' first album, Tegomasu no Uta, was released on July 15, 2009. Tegomasu no Uta went to #1, selling 80,028 copies in the first week, with total sales so far of 99,534.

The mini-album Tegomass no Ai was released on April, 2010, shortly before the second tour, named after Tegomass no Ai, which started in May, 2010.

"Tanabata Matsuri" and Tegomasu no Uta were both certified Gold for shipment of 100,000 copies. Tegomass's first live tour DVD was released on January 20, 2010.

Tegomass 3rd album "Tegomass no Mahou" released on October 19, 2011 and top the Oricon chart. Their third concert was held that same year.

On June 19, 2020, Tegoshi ended his contract with Johnny's Entertainment, effectively breaking up Tegomass as well.

Tegomass in Sweden
Tegomass made a promotional trip to Sweden from November 14 to 17 in 2006. On 14 November, they were occupied with various interviews for TV and newspapers, but on the 15th they held a promotion event at SpyBar in Stockholm. Here Tegomass performed "Miso Soup" in English as well as "Hajimete no Asa" live on stage. After their performance, Tegomass held a hand-shaking event for all the fans who were also able to say a few words to them. The Swedish edition of the single (including "Miso Soup" in English and as a karaoke track) could be bought during this event, along with a Swedish edition of Shuuji to Akira's "Seishun Amigo" single. The same night, from around 7:30 to 10:00 pm, there was a release party, also at SpyBar, for journalists and fans over 20 years of age who signed up on the guest list.

Musical style
Tegomass specializes in the aforementioned Bacharach-style ballads.

Discography

Albums

Extended plays

Singles

Promotional singles

Video albums

Notes

External links
Oricon profile
DN.se - Tegomass in Swedish newspapers
Expressen - Tegomass in Swedish newspapers
Nippon Project - exclusive private interview

References

Japanese idol groups
Japanese boy bands
Johnny & Associates
Japanese pop music groups
Japanese musical duos
Musical groups from Tokyo
Musical groups established in 2006
Musical groups disestablished in 2020